Phillip Benjamin Clark (born May 6, 1968) is an American former professional baseball outfielder and coach. He most recently served as the assistant hitting coach for the Detroit Tigers of Major League Baseball (MLB). He played for the Detroit Tigers, San Diego Padres, and Boston Red Sox. He also played four seasons in Japan with the Kintetsu Buffaloes.

Playing career
Clark signed with the Detroit Tigers after being selected with their first-round pick in the 1986 Major League Baseball Draft out of high school, and made his major league debut with the Tigers in 1992. He was sent off to the San Diego Padres the following year, and hit .313 with 9 home runs in 102 games. He continued to play part-time before being released by the Boston Red Sox in 1996. He joined the Kintetsu Buffaloes in the Japanese Pacific League in 1997, and hit 23 home runs with a .331 batting average (second in the league after Ichiro Suzuki) in his first year to win the Best Nine Award at first base. He hit 48 doubles in 1998, which was the Japanese single-season record until Yoshitomo Tani broke it in 2001, and ended with a .320 batting average, with 31 home runs and 114 RBIs to win his second consecutive Best Nine Award. His production decreased in 1999, but he still won a third Best Nine Award at designated hitter. In 2000, he missed over half of the season after being hit by a pitch, and was released at the end of the year.

Coaching career
On December 9, 2014, Clark was named the hitting coach for the Class-A West Michigan Whitecaps.

On December 2, 2015, Clark was named the hitting coach for the Double-A Erie SeaWolves.

On November 2, 2017, Clark was named the assistant hitting coach for the Detroit Tigers for the 2018 season.

On December 20, 2020, Clark was hired by the Wei Chuan Dragons of the Chinese Professional Baseball League to be the team's hitting coach for the ensuing season.

Personal life
His brother, Jerald Clark, also played in the major leagues and Nippon Professional Baseball.

References

External links

 Nippon Professional Baseball career statistics

1968 births
Living people
African-American baseball coaches
African-American baseball players
American expatriate baseball players in Canada
American expatriate baseball players in Japan
Baseball coaches from Texas
Baseball players from Texas
Boston Red Sox players
Bristol Tigers players
Detroit Tigers coaches
Detroit Tigers players
Fayetteville Generals players
Kintetsu Buffaloes players
Lakeland Tigers players
London Tigers players
Major League Baseball hitting coaches
Major League Baseball outfielders
Minor league baseball coaches
Nashua Pride players
Nippon Professional Baseball designated hitters
Osaka Kintetsu Buffaloes players
Pawtucket Red Sox players
People from Crockett, Texas
San Diego Padres players
Toledo Mud Hens players
21st-century African-American people
20th-century African-American sportspeople